Cameby is a rural locality in the Western Downs Region, Queensland, Australia.

Geography 
The Warrego Highway and Western railway line are the southern boundary of the locality. The Rywung railway station serves the locality.

There is an identified thermal coal resource area known as Davies Road with reserves estimated at  within the locality.

The land use is predominantly grazing on native vegetation with some cropping.

History 
Cambey Provisional School opened in 1922 and closed circa 1935. It was at 613 Cameby Road.

Rywung State School opened on 1 November 1944 and closed on 31 December 1968. It was located on C Kerrs Road near the Warrego Highway north of the Rywung railway station. Being north of the Warrego Highway means the school's location is now within Cameby.

Education 
There are no schools in the locality. The nearest primary schools are Chinchilla State School in Chinchilla to the south-east and Miles State School in Miles to the west. The nearest primary schools are Chinchilla State HIgh School in Chinchilla and Miles State High School in Miles.

References 

Western Downs Region
Localities in Queensland